The New Class: An Analysis of the Communist System is a political theory book about the concept of the new class by communist Yugoslav figure and intellectual Milovan Đilas. He proposed that the party-state officials formed a class which "uses, enjoys and disposes of nationalised property".

References

1957 non-fiction books
Books by Milovan Đilas
Harcourt (publisher) books
Political science books